The 2007–08 season was Motherwell's 10th season in the Scottish Premier League, and their 23rd consecutive season in the top division of Scottish football. Because of finishing 3rd in the SPL, the club managed to qualify for Europe in the UEFA Cup, their first season in Europe for 13 years.

Important events
 18 June 2007 – Motherwell name Mark McGhee as their new manager, replacing Maurice Malpas, who was sacked at the end of the previous season.
 4 August 2007 – The first Scottish Premier League fixture of the season (against St Mirren) ends in a 1–0 win at Love Street.
 25 August 2007 – Motherwell play at Fir Park as the away team for the first time in their history, in a match with Gretna, who are groundsharing for the season. Motherwell win the match 2-1
 29 August 2007 – The first League Cup fixture of the season against Raith Rovers ends in a 3–1 win at Fir Park. Motherwell advance to the Third Round.
 31 October 2007 – Motherwell are eliminated from the League Cup against Rangers, ending in a 2–1 defeat at Fir Park
 29 December 2007 – Captain Phil O'Donnell dies after collapsing on the pitch during Motherwell's 5–3 win over Dundee United. A post mortem reveals left ventricular failure of the heart. Motherwell's next two games (against Hibernian and Celtic) are postponed as a mark of respect. Players wear O'Donnell's signature on their shirts for the rest of the season.
 4 January 2008 – The funeral of Phil O'Donnell is held at St. Mary's Church, Hamilton.
 12 January 2008 – The first Scottish Cup fixture of the season against Hearts (also the first match Motherwell play since O'Donnell's death) ends in a 2–2 draw at Tynecastle. Motherwell win the replay 1–0. The club advance to the Fifth Round.
 4 February 2008 – Motherwell are eliminated from the Scottish Cup after a 2–1 defeat to Dundee at Fir Park.
 10 May 2008 – Motherwell beat Aberdeen 2–1 to all but seal their place in next seasons UEFA Cup. Hibernian's 2–0 defeat to Celtic confirms Motherwell's place in Europe for the first time in 13 years.
 22 May 2008 – The final Scottish Premier League fixture of the season against Hibernian ends in a 2–0 win at Easter Road.

Transfers

In

Out

Loans in

Released

Loans out

Motherwell F.C. Season 2007-08 first-team squad
Updated 5 December 2010

(c)

Motherwell F.C. 2007-08 season

Appearances
Updated 8 December 2010

|}

2007-08 Motherwell Top scorers

Last updated on 8 December 2010

2007-08 Motherwell Disciplinary Record

Last updated 8 December 2010

Last Updated - 8 December 2010

Results and fixtures

Scottish Premier League

Scottish Cup 2007–08

Scottish League Cup 2007–08

Overall

Classification

Results summary

Results by round

Results by opponent

Source: 2007–08 Scottish Premier League article

See also
 List of Motherwell F.C. seasons

References

Motherwell F.C. seasons
Motherwell